beIN Sports Spain was a Spanish network of sports channels owned by Qatari Sports Investments (an affiliate of beIN Media Group) and operated by Mediapro. It is the Spanish version of the global sports network beIN Sports.

beIN Sports holds the rights to broadcast several major association football tournaments on Spanish television. From the 2016/2017 season, Bein Sports will broadcast La Liga and Copa del Rey, featuring exclusive coverage of the two main European competitions UEFA Champions League and UEFA Europa League, the two main South American competitions Copa Libertadores and Copa Sudamericana and top national leagues including Ligue 1 and Serie A, along with content from other leagues in Europe and the main national cups including Coupe de France, KNVB Beker, DFB-Pokal and Copa do Brasil.

History
On 1 July 2015, after the closure of Gol Televisión, beIN Sports Spain officially launched in Spain on the online platform TotalChannel and Gol Stadium owned by Mediapro. Keeping the channel free viewing until 31 August only for those who were paid to Gol Televisión. On 1 August 2015, beIN Sports will become available on the main national Cable and Satellite platforms.

Offers 1,200 live matches each season and exclusive programming of own production like El Club, Xtra Champions League, Xtra Highlights, The Express Xtra, beINside and Offside with debate, analysis, special and documentaries.

BeIN Sports launched a YouTube pay channel on 20 October 2015, it closed in November 2016.

On 9 August 2018, After having lost the rights of the most emblematic competitions that it emitted (the UEFA Champions League, the UEFA Europa League and international leagues) the channel ceased its broadcasts, selling the few sports rights it still held to Movistar Liga de Campeones, Champions League, with limitations given by the National Commission of Markets and Competition.

The emissions were closed, although on August 25, 2018, 16 days later, they resumed the transmissions again.

Bein Connect
Mediapro operated beIN Connect in Spain, launched on 22 July 2015.

In 2017, it launched an entertainment TV bouquet, including Fox, AXN, Fox Life, TNT, TCM, Historia, Comedy Central, National Geographic and Nickelodeon. It was the first OTT offer in Spain.

After the closure of Bein Sports España, the entertainment bouquet disappeared in 2019. Gol remained available on the service until 10 March 2020 when beIN Connect España was definitively closed.

Programming
beIN Sports Spain features live and recorded events from the following leagues and competitions:

Football
UEFA
 : La Liga (8/10 matches per week and the first El Clásico), Copa del Rey and Primera División (women)
 : Ligue 1.
 : Serie A.

See also
 beIN Sports
 beIN Sports MENA
 beIN Sports France
 beIN Sports Turkey
 beIN Sports USA
 beIN Sports Australia
 beIN Sports Canada

References

External links
 
 
 

BeIN Sports
Sports mass media in Spain
Television stations in Spain
Spanish-language television stations
Television channels and stations established in 2015
2015 establishments in Spain
Sports television in Spain